Hvilsager is a village of Djursland located in Hvilsager Parish and Syddjurs Municipality. The Indian anthropologist G. Prakash Reddy did field work in the village in 1989, and published his observations in the book Sådan er danskerne! En indisk antropologs perspektiv på det danske samfund, translated into English as Danes are like that! Perspectives of an Indian anthropologist on the Danish society.

References 

Cities and towns in the Central Denmark Region
Villages in Denmark